Regnów  is a village in Rawa County, Łódź Voivodeship, in central Poland. It is the seat of the gmina (administrative district) called Gmina Regnów.

The village has a population of 340.

References

Villages in Rawa County
Piotrków Governorate
Łódź Voivodeship (1919–1939)